This is a list of notable people from Palakkad district in Kerala state, India.  The list includes celebrities in the fields of literature, arts, dance, drama, music, films and politics.

Literary personalities
   
 P. R. Pisharoty (Kollengode, father of remote sensing in India)
 Kunjan Nambiar
 Olappamanna
 O V Vijayan
 Akkitham Achuthan Namboothiri
 Malayattoor Ramakrishnan
 Shashi Tharoor
 O M C Narayanan Nambudiripad
 Anita Nair  
 K. S. Sethumadhavan

Art, dance, drama, music, sports and film personalities
 Kaushik Menon (Playback Singer) 
 M.S.Viswanathan (Composer and Playback Singer)
 M. D. Ramanathan (Carnatic)
 V T Bhattathiripad (Drama)
 Chembai Vaidyanatha Bhagavathar (Carnatic)
 Keezhpadam Kumaran Nair (Kathakali)
 Ramankutty Nair (Kathakali Artist)
 P. Leela (Playback Singer)
 Palghat Mani Iyer (Mrudangam)
 Unni Menon (Playback Singer)
 Swarnalatha (Playback Singer)
 P. Unnikrishnan (Carnatic and playback singer) 
 Stephen Devassy (Pianist, Composer, Arranger)
 Kutty (Cartoonist)
 Shyamaprasad (Film Director, Actor, Producer, Screenwriter, Writer)
 PU Chitra (Athlete)
 K.S. Sethumadhavan (Film Director)
 Major Ravi (Film Director)
 Gautham Vasudev Menon (Film Director)
 Anumol (Actress)
 Raghuvaran (Actor)
 Kalamandalam Kesavan (Actor)
 Madhupal (Actor)
 Street Academics (Hip-hop group)
 V. A. Shrikumar Menon (Film Director)
 Manikandan Pattambi (film actor)
 Parvathy Nambiar (Actress)
 Alathur Brothers (Carnatic)
 M. G. Ramachandran (Tamil Actor)
 Savitha Nambrath (Sound Desigher)
 Govind Padmasoorya (Indian Television Presenter)
 Lakshmy Ramakrishnan (Actress, screenwriter, director fashion designer)

Social, political and administrative personalities
 Sir Chettur Sankaran Nair (Lawyer, Statesman, Only Keralite to become President of the Indian National Congress)
 K P Kesava Menon (Idealist, Founder of Mathrubhoomi)
 Shivshankar Menon (International Diplomat)
 T. N. Seshan (Former Chief Election Commissioner)
 Shashi Tharoor (Under-Secretary General, UN)
 Prakash Karat (Former CPM General Secretary)
 E Sreedharan (Eminent Engineer, Delhi Metro Rail Corporation)
 M K Narayanan  (Chief of Indian Intelligence Bureau)
 V P Menon (Senior most Officer of British India Administration)
 Kunhiraman Palat Candeth (Lieutenant General in the Indian Army)
 K Sankaranarayanan (Governor of state)

References

People from Palakkad district